The 1912 Arizona football team was an American football team that represented the University of Arizona as an independent during the 1912 college football season. In its first and only season under head coach Raymond L. Quigley, the team compiled a 2–1 record and outscored its opponents by a total of 55 to 30. The team captain was Richard L Merritt.

Schedule

References

Arizona
Arizona Wildcats football seasons
Arizona football